The 1964–65 OB I bajnokság season was the 28th season of the OB I bajnokság, the top level of ice hockey in Hungary. Eight teams participated in the league, and Ujpesti Dozsa SC won the championship.

Regular season

Final
 Újpesti Dózsa SC - BVSC Budapest 3:2/3:3

External links
 Season on hockeyarchives.info

Hun
OB I bajnoksag seasons
1964–65 in Hungarian ice hockey